The Voyage of Snedgus and Mac Riagla is one of the three surviving Immrama, or ancient Irish voyage tales.

Early Irish literature
Irish mythology
Irish texts
Ireland in fiction
Medieval literature